Trompenburgh is a 17th-century manor house in 's-Graveland, the Netherlands, designed by Daniël Stalpaert and built for Admiral Cornelis Tromp, one of the naval heroes of the Dutch Republic. The house is almost entirely surrounded by water and was built to resemble a ship, even with decks and railings.

Before the current house was built another buitenplaats Sillisburgh had been built by Joan van Hellemondt  The original house dates back to 1654. Through inheritance the house came into the possession of the widow of Van Hellemont Raephorst, who remarried on 25 January 1667, with Cornelis Tromp. The couple redecorated the estate considerably, but the house and their improvements were treasure looted and burned by the French during the rampjaar 1672.

It was rebuilt from 1675 to 1684 by Tromp, who called it Sillisburgh, after one of his titles. Around 1720, Jacob Roeters came into possession of the estate and renamed it Trompenburgh. Roeters had a gilded plaque with an ode by Gerard Brandt in memory of Tromp installed over the entrance in 1725.

See also 

 Top 100 Dutch heritage sites

Footnotes

External links 

 

1654 establishments in the Dutch Republic
Buildings and structures in North Holland
Houses completed in 1654
Houses in the Netherlands
Rijksmonuments in North Holland
Wijdemeren